The striated starling (Aplonis striata) is a species of starling in the family Sturnidae. It is endemic to New Caledonia.

References

Birds described in 1788
Taxa named by Johann Friedrich Gmelin
Aplonis
Endemic birds of New Caledonia
Taxonomy articles created by Polbot